David Ryan Klingler (born February 17, 1969) is an associate professor of Bible exposition at Dallas Theological Seminary and a former American football quarterback.

College career
A 6-foot, 2-inch quarterback, Klingler rewrote numerous college passing records for the Houston Cougars from 1988 to 1991. On November 17, 1990, Klingler threw for an all-Divisions record 11 touchdown passes for a single quarterback against Eastern Washington University at the Astrodome, and on December 2 set the NCAA (Division I) record for most yards gained in a single game, 716 (since surpassed by Connor Halliday in 2014 and later Patrick Mahomes in 2016). In his four seasons at Houston, he completed 726 of 1,262 passes for 9,430 yards and 91 touchdowns, all of which were school records at the time. Klingler set the NCAA record for touchdown passes in a season with 54 in 1990. His single-season touchdown pass record stood for 16 years until it was broken in the 2006 Hawaii Bowl by University of Hawaii quarterback Colt Brennan with 58, though Brennan needed three more games than Klingler to break the record. Klingler made a valiant push to win the Heisman Trophy (following in the footsteps of fellow Cougar Andre Ware) but was eventually beaten by Ty Detmer of Brigham Young University and Raghib Ismail (runner-up) of Notre Dame. Klingler remained a stand-out for the University of Houston and still ranks in the FBS top ten for career touchdown passes and yards.

NFL career
Klingler was taken in the 1st round of the 1992 NFL Draft by the Cincinnati Bengals. From 1992 to 1995 he played for the Bengals—starting for the Bengals in 1993 and 1994 before losing his job to Jeff Blake. He then played two seasons as a backup for the Oakland Raiders. In 1998, he signed with the Green Bay Packers to back up Brett Favre, but he was cut and didn't play.

Klingler injured his elbow and shoulder in the offseason before his third season. After the 1994 season (his third), he underwent elbow surgery. Being informed that his injury was career ending, he knew that his career was all but done. Before the operation he could heave a ball 85 yards; afterward he struggled to reach 35.

In 2007, Klingler was listed at #10 on the NFL Network's "Top 10 Draft Busts" list.

After the NFL
Klingler entered school at Dallas Theological Seminary, earning both a master's degree in Theology and a Ph.D. in Old Testament studies. In June 2010, he became the director of DTS's Houston extension. On April 15, 2012, it was announced that Klingler was elected as assistant professor of biblical studies at Southwestern Baptist Theological Seminary's Havard School of Theological Studies in Houston. Klingler was also an analyst for the University of Houston's football radio network from 2006 to 2008.

Personal life
Klingler's brother Jimmy also played quarterback for the Houston Cougars. His niece, Baylee, played college softball at Washington.

See also
 List of NCAA major college football yearly passing leaders
 List of NCAA major college football yearly total offense leaders

References

1969 births
Living people
American football quarterbacks
Cincinnati Bengals players
Houston Cougars football players
Oakland Raiders players
People from Houston
Players of American football from Texas
Green Bay Packers players
Ed Block Courage Award recipients